CLTV may also refer to:
 Central Luzon Television, a Philippine television channel
 Chicagoland Television, a former Chicago-area regional news channel initialized in branding as CLTV
 CLTV, a United Kingdom-based satellite/cable network targeting older viewers
 Customer lifetime value
 Combined loan to value